This is a list of European basketball players who have played in the United States at either professional or NCAA Division I level. It is intended to include players who are currently active, whether inside or outside the U.S., and former players (both living and deceased).

For the purpose of this article, a "European player in the United States" is defined as a citizen of a FIBA Europe member country who was playing in the U.S. while a citizen of said country. Examples of players who do not fall within this definition are:
 Howard Carter, who became a naturalized citizen of France after having played professionally in that country, and never played in the U.S. while a French citizen.
 Jeff Taylor, whose story is similar to that of Carter, except that his eventual country of citizenship was Sweden. However, his son Jeffery, born in Sweden as a dual citizen of both the U.S. and Sweden, is listed.
 Kelenna Azubuike, who despite being born and raised in the United Kingdom has never held British citizenship. He was born a Nigerian citizen.
 Admiral Schofield, born in the UK to a U.S. military family. Since 1983, children born under these circumstances will not have British nationality unless a parent had such nationality. He was born in 1997 to parents who hold only U.S. nationality.

In addition, NBA players are considered to be playing in the United States even if they have played only for a Canada-based team (currently the Toronto Raptors, and in the past the Vancouver Grizzlies and Toronto Huskies). Similarly, those who have played in what is now the NBA G League are considered to be playing in the United States even if they have only played for the Raptors' Canada-based affiliate, Raptors 905.

If a player is listed as being a dual citizen, his or her country of birth is indicated first.

Austria

Active in the US
 Giorgi Bezhanishvili (dual Georgian/Austrian citizen) – Illinois Fighting Illini
 Luka Brajkovic – Davidson Wildcats
 Jakob Pöltl – Utah Utes, Raptors 905, Toronto Raptors, San Antonio Spurs

Belarus

Active in the US
 Dzmitry Ryuny – San Francisco Dons

Active outside the US
 Yelena Leuchanka – West Virginia Mountaineers and three WNBA teams
 Artsiom Parakhouski – Radford Highlanders

Former players
 Nikolai Alexeev - Buffalo Bulls

Belgium

Active in the US
 Emma Meesseman – Washington Mystics
 Julie Allemand - Indiana Fever

Active outside the US
 Ann Wauters – Four WNBA teams

Former players
 D. J. Mbenga – Four NBA teams
 Kristof Ongenaet – Syracuse Orange

Bosnia and Herzegovina

Active in the US
 Jusuf Nurkić – Portland Trail Blazers
 Luka Garza - Detroit Pistons

Active outside the US
 Džanan Musa – Brooklyn Nets
 Ajdin Penava – Marshall Thundering Herd

Former players
 Adnan Hodžić – Lipscomb Bisons
 Razija Mujanović – Detroit Shock
 Aleksandar Radojević – Two NBA teams
 Mirza Teletović – Three NBA teams
 Ratko Varda – Detroit Pistons

Bulgaria

Active outside the US
 Ilian Evtimov (also holds French citizenship) – NC State Wolfpack

Former players
 Vassil Evtimov (also holds French citizenship) – North Carolina Tar Heels
 Georgi Glouchkov – Phoenix Suns

Croatia

Active in the US
 Bojan Bogdanović – Utah Jazz
 Luka Šamanić - New York Knicks
 Dario Šarić – Phoenix Suns
 Ivica Zubac – Los Angeles Clippers

Active outside the US
 Mario Hezonja – Orlando Magic, New York Knicks, Portland Trail Blazers
 Marin Marić – Northern Illinois Huskies, DePaul Blue Demons
 Damir Markota (also holds Swedish citizenship) – Milwaukee Bucks, Tulsa 66ers
 Marin Mornar – Loyola Marymount Lions
 Damjan Rudež – Indiana Pacers, Minnesota Timberwolves, Orlando Magic
 Iva Slišković – South Carolina Gamecocks
 Goran Suton (also naturalized in the US) – Michigan State Spartans
 Roko Ukić – Toronto Raptors, Milwaukee Bucks
 Antonio Vranković – Duke Blue Devils
 Tomislav Zubčić – Oklahoma City Blue

Former players
 Dalibor Bagarić – Chicago Bulls
 Krešimir Ćosić – BYU Cougars
 Gordan Giriček – Five NBA teams
 Koraljka Hlede  – Three WNBA teams
 Mario Kasun – Orlando Magic
 Toni Kukoč (also naturalized U.S. citizen)– Four NBA teams, most notably the Chicago Bulls
 Dražen Petrović – Portland Trail Blazers, New Jersey Nets
 Zoran Planinić – New Jersey Nets
 Dino Radja – Boston Celtics
 Davor Rimac – Arkansas Razorbacks
 Bruno Šundov – Five NBA teams
 Žan Tabak – Four NBA teams
 Stojko Vranković – Three NBA teams

Cyprus

Active outside the US
 Erten Gazi (dual Cypriot/Turkish citizen by birth) – DePaul Blue Demons, Fordham Rams

Czech Republic

Active in the US
 Vit Krejci - Oklahoma City Thunder

Active outside the US
 Tomáš Satoranský – New Orleans Pelicans
 Patrik Auda – Seton Hall
 Ilona Burgrová – South Carolina Gamecocks
 Jan Veselý – Washington Wizards, Denver Nuggets

Former players
 Luboš Bartoň – Valparaiso Crusaders
 Eva Horáková – Cleveland Rockers
 Zuzana Klimešová – Vanderbilt Commodores, Indiana Fever
 Michaela Pavlíčková – Denver Pioneers, Utah Starzz, Phoenix Mercury
 Jana Veselá – Seattle Storm
 Kamila Vodičková – Seattle Storm, Phoenix Mercury
 Jiří Welsch – Four NBA teams
 George Zidek – UCLA Bruins and three NBA teams

Denmark

Active in the US
 David Knudsen – Marist Red Foxes
 Gabriel Lundberg – Phoenix Suns

Active outside the US
 David Andersen (dual Australian/Danish citizen by birth) – Three NBA teams
 Chris Christoffersen – Oregon Ducks, Roanoke Dazzle
 Asbjørn Midtgaard – Wichita State Shockers, Grand Canyon

Former players
 Michael Andersen – Rhode Island Rams
 Christian Drejer – Florida Gators
 Lars Hansen (dual Danish/Canadian citizen) – Washington Huskies, Seattle SuperSonics
 Jacob Larsen – Gonzaga Bulldogs
 Inge Nissen – Old Dominion Lady Monarchs, Chicago Hustle
 Anne Thorius – Michigan Wolverines

Estonia

Active in the US
 Kerr Kriisa – Arizona Wildcats
 Matthias Tass – Saint Mary's Gaels

Active outside the US
 Janari Jõesaar – Ole Miss Rebels, UTPA Broncs/UTRGV Vaqueros
 Maik Kotsar – South Carolina Gamecocks
 Rauno Nurger – Wichita State Shockers

Former players
 Martin Müürsepp – Miami Heat, Dallas Mavericks
 Tanel Tein – St. Francis Brooklyn Terriers

Finland

Active in the US
 Lauri Markkanen – Arizona Wildcats - Chicago Bulls - Cleveland Cavaliers - Utah Jazz

Active outside the US
 Samuel Haanpää – Valparaiso Crusaders
 Mikko Koivisto – UNC Greensboro Spartans
 Tuukka Kotti – Providence Friars
 Gerald Lee (dual Finnish/US citizen by birth) – Old Dominion Monarchs
 Alex Murphy (dual US/Finnish citizen by birth) – Duke Blue Devils, Florida Gators, Northeastern Huskies
Erik Murphy (dual US/Finnish citizen by birth) – Florida Gators, Chicago Bulls, Utah Jazz, Austin Spurs
Kimmo Muurinen – Arkansas–Little Rock Trojans
 Antti Nikkilä – Valparaiso Crusaders
 Tiina Sten – St. John's Red Storm

Former players
 Joonas Cavén – Reno Bighorns
Pekka Markkanen – Kansas Jayhawks
 Hanno Möttölä – Utah Utes, Atlanta Hawks
 Michaela Moua – Ohio State Buckeyes
 Timo Saarelainen – BYU Cougars
 Joonas Suotamo – Penn State Nittany Lions

France

Active in the US
 Alexis Ajinça – Four NBA teams
 Joël Ayayi – Gonzaga Bulldogs
 Nicolas Batum – Three NBA teams, currently with the Los Angeles Clippers
 Evan Fournier – Denver Nuggets, Orlando Magic, Boston Celtics, New York Knicks
 Rudy Gobert – Utah Jazz, Minnesota Timberwolves
 Sandrine Gruda – Connecticut Sun, Los Angeles Sparks
 Jaylen Hoard - Wake Forest Demon Deacons, Portland Trail Blazers, Oklahoma City Thunder
 Damien Inglis – Milwaukee Bucks
 Timothé Luwawu-Cabarrot – Philadelphia 76ers, Oklahoma City Thunder, Chicago Bulls, Brooklyn Nets, Atlanta Hawks
 Ian Mahinmi – Four NBA teams
 Joakim Noah (dual US/French citizen by birth) – Florida Gators, Chicago Bulls, New York Knicks, Memphis Grizzlies, Los Angeles Clippers
 Frank Ntilikina – New York Knicks, Dallas Mavericks
 Yves Pons – Tennessee Volunteers
 Olivier Sarr – Wake Forest Demon Deacons
 Killian Tillie – Gonzaga Bulldogs, Memphis Grizzlies
 Théo Maledon – Oklahoma City Thunder
 Killian Hayes, Detroit Pistons

Active outside the US
 Frédéric Adjiwanou – Saint Mary's Gaels
 Valériane Ayayi – San Antonio Stars
 Rodrigue Beaubois – Dallas Mavericks
 Nando de Colo – San Antonio Spurs, Toronto Raptors
 Yakhouba Diawara – Pepperdine Waves, Denver Nuggets, Miami Heat
 Céline Dumerc – Atlanta Dream
 Mickaël Gelabale – Seattle SuperSonics, Minnesota Timberwolves, and two D-League teams
 Edwige Lawson-Wade – Four WNBA teams, most notably the San Antonio Silver Stars
 Jérôme Moïso – UCLA Bruins and six NBA teams
 Johan Petro – Five NBA teams
 Pape Sy – Atlanta Hawks
 Kim Tillie – Utah Utes
 Guerschon Yabusele - Boston Celtics, ASVEL
 Will Yeguete (dual French/Central African Republic citizen by birth) – Florida Gators

Former players
Tony Parker - San Antonio Spurs, Charlotte Hornets
Tariq Abdul-Wahad – Michigan Wolverines, San Jose State Spartans, and four NBA teams
 Lucienne Berthieu – Old Dominion Lady Monarchs, Cleveland Rockers, Houston Comets
 Boris Diaw – Five NBA teams
 Stéphane Dondon – Virginia Cavaliers
 Paoline Ékambi – Marist Red Foxes
 Isabelle Fijalkowski – Colorado Buffaloes, Cleveland Rockers
 Mickaël Piétrus – Five NBA teams
 Antoine Rigaudeau – Dallas Mavericks
 Laure Savasta – Washington Huskies, Sacramento Monarchs
 Ronny Turiaf – Gonzaga Bulldogs and seven NBA teams

Georgia

Active in the US
Rati Andronikashvili - Creighton Bluejays
Giorgi Bezhanishvili (dual Georgian/Austrian citizen) - Illinois Fighting Illini
Goga Bitadze – Indiana Pacers
Saba Gigiberia - Georgia Tech Yellow Jackets
Willy Isiani - Detroit Mercy Titans
Sandro Mamukelashvili (dual US/Georgian citizen by birth) – Milwaukee Bucks
Aleksandre Merkviladze – Cal State Northridge Matadors
Nikoloz Metskhvarishvili – Louisiana–Monroe Warhawks
Tsotne Tsartsidze – North Dakota Fighting Hawks
Zurab Zhgenti – Northwestern State Demons

Active outside the US

 Tornike Shengelia – Brooklyn Nets, Chicago Bulls
Duda Sanadze - Graduated from San Diego Toreros in 2016

Former players
Nikoloz Tskitishvili – Four teams, most notably the Denver Nuggets
Jake Tsakalidis (dual Georgian/Greek citizen) - Phoenix Suns, Memphis Grizzlies, Houston Rockets
 Vladimir Stepania - Four NBA teams
Zaza Pachulia - 16 seasons in NBA. 2 time NBA champion with Golden State Warriors, currently working for the Warriors as a consultant.

Germany

Active in the US
 Isaac Bonga – Toronto Raptors
 Maxi Kleber – Dallas Mavericks
 Isaiah Hartenstein – Los Angeles Clippers
 Satou Sabally (US and Gambian citizen by birth) – Oregon Ducks, Dallas Wings
 Dennis Schröder – Boston Celtics, Los Angeles Lakers
 Daniel Theis – Houston Rockets
 Franz Wagner – Orlando Magic
 Moritz Wagner – Orlando Magic, Washington Wizards
 Benny Schröder – University of Oklahoma Sooners

Active outside the US
 Richard Fröhlich – UTSA Roadrunners
 Niels Giffey – Connecticut Huskies
 Elias Harris – Gonzaga Bulldogs, Los Angeles Lakers, Los Angeles D-Fenders
 Yassin Idbihi – Buffalo Bulls
 Maodo Lô – Columbia Lions 
 Jan Jagla – Penn State Nittany Lions
 Christopher McNaughton – Bucknell Bison
 Tim Ohlbrecht – Houston Rockets and two D-League teams
 Tibor Pleiß - Utah Jazz
 Martin Seiferth – Oregon Ducks, Eastern Washington Eagles
 Robin Smeulders (German, Austrian, and Dutch citizen by birth) – Portland Pilots
 Lucca Staiger – Iowa State Cyclones
 Christian Sengfelder – Fordham Rams, Boise State Broncos
 Christian Standhardinger (German/Filipino citizen by birth) – Nebraska Cornhuskers, Hawaii Rainbow Warriors
 Konrad Wysocki – Princeton Tigers

Former players
 Marlies Askamp – Three WNBA teams
 Uwe Blab – Indiana Hoosiers and three NBA teams
 Shawn Bradley – Dallas Mavericks
 Bradley was born in Germany, but it is unclear whether he was eligible for German citizenship at birth. After changes in the country's nationality law, he obtained German citizenship in 2001, while retaining his American nationality. His college career at BYU and the bulk of his NBA career predate his acquisition of German citizenship.
 Patrick Femerling – Washington Huskies
 Frido Frey (naturalized in the US) – LIU Brooklyn Blackbirds (then simply LIU), New York Knicks
 Linda Fröhlich – UNLV Rebels and four WNBA teams
 Hansi Gnad – Alaska–Anchorage Seawolves
 Johannes Herber – West Virginia Mountaineers
 Chris Kaman – Five NBA teams, currently free agent
 Kaman, born and raised in the U.S., was eligible for German citizenship from birth, but did not become a German citizen until 2008. 
 Alexander Kühl – Charlotte 49ers (then branded as UNC Charlotte)
 Jens Kujawa – Illinois Fighting Illini
 Dirk Nowitzki – Dallas Mavericks
 Ademola Okulaja – North Carolina Tar Heels
 Henrik Rödl – North Carolina Tar Heels
 Christian Schmidt – Buffalo Bulls
 Detlef Schrempf – Washington Huskies and four NBA teams
 Torsten Stein – Fairleigh Dickinson Knights 
 Chris Welp – Washington Huskies and three NBA teams
 Paul Zipser – Chicago Bulls

Greece

Active in the US
 Giannis Antetokounmpo – Milwaukee Bucks
 Tyler Dorsey (dual US/Greek citizen by birth) – Oregon Ducks
 Kosta Koufos (dual US/Greek citizen by birth) – Ohio State Buckeyes and five NBA teams, currently with the Sacramento Kings
 Kostas Antetokounmpo – Dayton Flyers, Dallas Mavericks, Texas Legends, Los Angeles Lakers, South Bay Lakers
 Thanasis Antetokounmpo – Delaware 87ers, Westchester Knicks, New York Knicks, Milwaukee Bucks

Active outside the US
 Georgios Papagiannis – Sacramento Kings
 Nick Calathes (dual US/Greek citizen by birth) – Florida Gators, Memphis Grizzlies
 Pat Calathes (dual US/Greek citizen by birth) – Saint Joseph's Hawks
 Antonis Fotsis – Memphis Grizzlies
 Andreas Glyniadakis – Seattle SuperSonics and two D-League teams
 Evanthia Maltsi – Connecticut Sun
 Paris Maragkos – George Washington Colonials, American Eagles
 Ioannis Papapetrou – Texas Longhorns
 Kostas Papanikolaou – Denver Nuggets, Houston Rockets
 Nick Paulos (dual US/Greek citizen by birth) – UNC Greensboro Spartans
 Artemis Spanou – Robert Morris Colonials (women)
 Vassilis Spanoulis – Houston Rockets
 Georgios Tsalmpouris – Iowa State Cyclones
 Zach Auguste (dual US/Greek citizen by birth) - Notre Dame Fighting Irish

Former players
 Panagiotis Fasoulas – NC State Wolfpack
 Nikos Galis (dual US/Greek citizen by birth) – Seton Hall Pirates
 Efthimios Rentzias – Philadelphia 76ers
 Georgios Trontzos – Gonzaga Bulldogs
 Jake Tsakalidis (born in Republic of Georgia) – Phoenix Suns and two NBA teams
 Anastasia Kostaki - Houston Comets

Hungary

Active in the US
 Allie Quigley (US/Hungarian dual citizen) – Chicago Sky
 Quigley played college basketball at DePaul and professionally for four other WNBA teams before acquiring Hungarian citizenship in 2012.
 Courtney Vandersloot (US/Hungarian dual citizen) – Chicago Sky
 Vandersloot played college basketball at Gonzaga and professionally for the Sky before acquiring Hungarian citizenship in 2016.

Former players
 Kornél Dávid – Four NBA teams, most notably with the Chicago Bulls
 Andrea Nagy – FIU Panthers (then Golden Panthers) and three WNBA teams

Iceland

Active in the US
 Elín Sóley Hrafnkelsdóttir – Tulsa Golden Hurricane
 Hakon Hjalmarsson – Binghamton Bearcats
 Sigrún Björg Ólafsdóttir – Chattanooga Mocs
 Styrmir Snær Þrastarson – Davidson Wildcats
 Thelma Dís Ágústsdóttir – Ball State Cardinals

Active outside the US
 Dagný Lísa Davíðsdóttir – Wyoming Cowgirls, Niagara Purple Eagles
 Dagur Kár Jónsson – St. Francis Brooklyn Terriers
 Elvar Már Friðriksson – LIU Brooklyn Blackbirds
 Gunnar Ólafsson – St. Francis Brooklyn Terriers
 Haukur Pálsson – Maryland Terrapins
 Helena Sverrisdóttir – TCU Horned Frogs
 Hildur Björg Kjartansdóttir – Texas–Rio Grande Valley Vaqueros
 Ingvi Þór Guðmundsson – Saint Louis Billikens
 Jón Axel Guðmundsson – Davidson Wildcats
 Kári Jónsson – Drexel Dragons
 Kristinn Pálsson – Marist Red Foxes
 Martin Hermannsson – LIU Brooklyn Blackbirds
 Sara Rún Hinriksdóttir – Canisius Golden Griffins
 Þórir Þorbjarnarson – Nebraska Cornhuskers

Former players
 Falur Harðarson – Charleston Southern Buccaneers
 Fannar Ólafsson – South Carolina Gamecocks
 Flosi Sigurðsson – Washington Huskies
 Magnús Matthíasson – Rice Owls
 Margrét Sturlaugsdóttir – Charleston Southern Buccaneers
 Pétur Guðmundsson – Washington Huskies, three NBA teams, and five teams in the CBA and USBL
 Símon Ólafsson – Cornell Big Red

Ireland

Active in the US
 Eoin Nelson – Wyoming Cowboys
 CJ Fulton – Lafayette Leopards

Former players
 Pat Burke (dual Irish/US citizen) – Auburn Tigers, Orlando Magic, Phoenix Suns
 Jason Killeen – Winthrop Eagles

Israel

Active in the US
 Sue Bird (dual US/Israeli citizen) – Seattle Storm
 Bird, born in the U.S. to a Jewish father, acquired Israeli citizenship in 2006. She represents the U.S. internationally.
 T. J. Leaf - UCLA Bruins - Indiana Pacers
Deni Avdija - Washington Wizards

Active outside the US
 Omri Casspi – Memphis Grizzlies
 Shay Doron – Maryland Terrapins, New York Liberty
 Karam Mashour – Morehead State Eagles, UNLV Runnin' Rebels
 Gal Mekel – Wichita State Shockers, Dallas Mavericks
 Nimrod Tishman – Florida Gators

Former players
 Nadav Henefeld – Connecticut Huskies
 Doron Sheffer – Connecticut Huskies

Italy

Active in the US
 Ryan Arcidiacono (dual US/Italian citizen by birth) – Villanova Wildcats, Chicago Bulls
 Danilo Gallinari – 6 NBA Teams, currently Boston Celtics
 Federico Mussini – St. John's Red Storm

Active outside the US
 Marco Belinelli –  Eight NBA teams, he won an NBA title with San Antonio Spurs.
 Luigi Datome – Detroit Pistons, Boston Celtics
 Amedeo Della Valle – Ohio State Buckeyes
 Daniel Hackett – USC Trojans
 Alessandro Lever – Grand Canyon Antelopes
 Davide Moretti – Texas Tech Red Raiders
 Kathrin Ress – Boston College Eagles, Minnesota Lynx
 Nicolò Melli - Dallas Mavericks, New Orleans Pelicans
 Nico Mannion - Golden State Warriors,
 Tomas Woldetensae - University of Virginia
 Cecilia Zandalasini - Minnesota Lynx

Former players
 Mike D'Antoni (dual US/Italian citizen by birth) – Marshall Thundering Herd and three teams in the NBA and ABA
 Stefano Rusconi – Phoenix Suns
 Vincenzo Esposito – Toronto Raptors
 Andrea Bargnani – Toronto Raptors, New York Knicks, Brooklyn Nets

Kosovo

Active in the US
 Dardan Kapiti – Florida Atlantic

Latvia

Active in the US
 Anete Jēkabsone-Žogota – Connecticut Sun, Phoenix Mercury
 Kristaps Porziņģis – New York Knicks, Dallas Mavericks, Washington Wizards
 Dāvis Bertāns - San Antonio Spurs, Washington Wizards
 Rodions Kurucs – Brooklyn Nets

Active outside the US
 Gunta Baško – Siena Saints
 Andris Biedriņš – Golden State Warriors, Utah Jazz
 Liene Jansone – Siena Saints
 Kaspars Kambala – UNLV Runnin' Rebels
 Haralds Kārlis – Seton Hall Pirates
 Rihards Kuksiks – Arizona State Sun Devils
 Aija Putniņa – Colorado Buffaloes
 Zane Tamane – Western Illinois Leathernecks
 During her time at Western Illinois, only men's teams were known as Leathernecks; women's teams were Westerwinds.
 Ričmonds Vilde – SMU Mustangs, Houston Baptist Huskies

Former players
 Ieva Kubliņa – Virginia Tech Hokies
 Raimonds Miglinieks – UC Irvine Anteaters
 Artūrs Štālbergs – Evansville Purple Aces
 Gundars Vētra – Minnesota Timberwolves

Lithuania

Active in the US 
 Martynas Arlauskas – Gonzaga Bulldogs
 Ignas Brazdeikis – Michigan Wolverines - New York Knicks - Orlando Magic
 Augustas Marčiulionis – Saint Mary's Gaels
 Domantas Sabonis (Lithuanian citizen by birth) – Gonzaga Bulldogs - Oklahoma City Thunder - Indiana Pacers - Sacramento Kings
 Deividas Sirvydis  – Detroit Pistons
 Ąžuolas Tubelis  – Arizona Wildcats
 Tautvilas Tubelis  – Arizona Wildcats
 Jonas Valančiūnas  - Toronto Raptors – Memphis Grizzlies - New Orleans Pelicans

Active outside the US 
 Martynas Andriuškevičius – Cleveland Cavaliers
 Deividas Dulkys – Florida State Seminoles
 Rapolas Ivanauskas – Northwestern Wildcats, Colgate Raiders, Cincinnati Bearcats
 Robertas Javtokas – Arizona Wildcats
 Evaldas Jocys – East Carolina Pirates
 Mindaugas Katelynas – Chattanooga Mocs
 Rimantas Kaukėnas – Seton Hall Pirates
 Antanas Kavaliauskas – Texas A&M Aggies
 Linas Kleiza – Missouri Tigers, Denver Nuggets, Toronto Raptors
 Mindaugas Kuzminskas – New York Knicks
 Gabrielius Maldūnas – Dartmouth Big Green
 Laurynas Mikalauskas – Virginia Cavaliers
 Egidijus Mockevičius – Evansville Purple Aces, Long Island Nets
 Darius Songaila – Wake Forest Demon Deacons and five NBA teams
 Donatas Zavackas – Pittsburgh Panthers
 Donatas Motiejūnas – Shandong Golden Stars

Former players 
 Arvydas Eitutavičius – American Eagles
 Žydrūnas Ilgauskas – Cleveland Cavaliers, Miami Heat
 Šarūnas Jasikevičius – Maryland Terrapins, Indiana Pacers, Golden State Warriors
 Andrius Jurkūnas – Clemson Tigers
 Mindaugas Kacinas – South Carolina Gamecocks
 Artūras Karnišovas – Seton Hall Pirates
 Saulius Kuzminskas – California Golden Bears
 Arvydas Macijauskas – New Orleans/Oklahoma City Hornets
 Kęstutis Marčiulionis – Delaware Fightin' Blue Hens
 Šarūnas Marčiulionis – Golden State Warriors, Seattle SuperSonics, Sacramento Kings, Denver Nuggets
 Tomas Nagys – Clemson Tigers
 Marijonas Petravičius – South Carolina Gamecocks
 Karolis Petrukonis – Clemson Tigers
 Martynas Pocius – Duke Blue Devils
 Arvydas Sabonis – Portland Trail Blazers
 Mindaugas Timinskas – Iona Gaels

Montenegro

Active in the US
 Nikola Vučević (born in Switzerland, raised in Belgium) – USC Trojans, Philadelphia 76ers, Orlando Magic, Chicago Bulls

Active outside the US
 Slavko Vraneš – Portland Trail Blazers

Former players
 Žarko Čabarkapa – Phoenix Suns, Golden State Warriors
 Predrag Drobnjak – Three NBA teams
 Žarko Đurišić – Wichita State Shockers
 Luka Pavićević – Utah Utes
 Sasha Pavlović – Seven NBA teams
Nikola Pekovic

Netherlands

Active in the US
 Matt Haarms – Purdue Boilermakers; played for the BYU Cougars in 2020–21
Kjell de Graaf – NJIT Highlanders
 Rienk Mast – Bradley Braves

Active outside the US
 Luuk van Bree – Bradley Braves
 Dan Gadzuric – UCLA Bruins and four NBA teams
 Kenneth van Kempen – Ohio Bobcats
 Charlon Kloof (born in Suriname) – St. Bonaventure Bonnies
 Robert Krabbendam – Virginia Tech Hokies
 Thomas van der Mars – Portland Pilots
 Roeland Schaftenaar – Oregon State Beavers
 Lucas Steijn – Idaho State Bengals
 Kevin van Wijk – Valparaiso Crusaders
 Kenrick Zondervan – UCF Knights

Former players
 Henry Bekkering (dual Canadian/Dutch citizen by birth) – Eastern Washington Eagles
 Francisco Elson – California Golden Bears and six NBA teams
 Geert Hammink – LSU Tigers and two NBA teams
 Swen Nater – UCLA Bruins and six teams in the ABA and NBA
 Peter van Noord – Fresno State Bulldogs
 Peter van Paassen – St. Bonaventure Bonnies
 Rik Smits – Marist Red Foxes, Indiana Pacers
 Serge Zwikker – North Carolina Tar Heels
 Kevin Bleeker – Canisius Golden Griffins

North Macedonia

Active in the US
 Andrej Jakimovski – Washington State Cougars

Former players

• Pero Antic - Atlanta Hawks

Norway

Active outside the US
 Harald Frey – Montana State Bobcats
 Karamo Jawara – North Carolina Central Eagles
 Terrence Oglesby (dual Norwegian/US citizen by birth) – Clemson Tigers
 Torgrim Sommerfeldt – Manhattan Jaspers

Former players
 Torgeir Bryn – Texas State Bobcats (then Southwest Texas State), Los Angeles Clippers and several minor-league teams

Poland

Active in the US
 Maciej Bender - West Virginia Mountaineers, Mercer Bears
 Olgierd Dmochewicz - Northern Arizona Lumberjacks
 Jakub Karwowski - Utah State Aggies
 Jakub Mijakowski - Penn Quakers, Jefferson Rams
 Igor Milicić Jr. - Virginia Cavaliers
 Jeremy Sochan - San Antonio Spurs

Active outside the US
 Olek Czyz – Duke Blue Devils, Nevada Wolf Pack, and two D-League teams
 Tomasz Gielo – Two college teams
 Karol Gruszecki – UT Arlington Mavericks
 Adam Hrycaniuk – Cincinnati Bearcats
 Przemek Karnowski – Gonzaga Bulldogs
 Maciej Lampe (dual Polish/Swedish citizen) – Four NBA teams
 Jakub Nizioł - Cal Poly Mustangs men's basketball
 Dominik Olejniczak - Drake Bulldogs, Ole Miss Rebels, Florida State Seminoles

Former players
 Patrycja Czepiec - California Golden Bears
 Margo Dydek – Three WNBA teams
 Marta Dydek – UTEP Miners
 Marcin Gortat – Three NBA teams, Los Angeles Clippers
 Michał Ignerski – Mississippi State Bulldogs
 Wojciech Myrda – Louisiana–Monroe Warhawks
 Myrda's college career spanned his school's 1999 name change from Northeast Louisiana to Louisiana–Monroe. The school nickname was Indians throughout his college career.
 Łukasz Obrzut – Kentucky Wildcats
 Dawid Przybyszewski – Vanderbilt Commodores
 Hubert Radke – Loyola Ramblers
 Paweł Stasiak – Washington State Cougars
 Cezary Trybański – Three NBA teams
 Maciej Zieliński – Providence Friars
 Jacek Duda – Providence Friars

Portugal

Active in the US
 Neemias Queta – Sacramento Kings

Active outside the US
 Cândido Sá – Rutgers Scarlet Knights

Former players
 Ticha Penicheiro – Old Dominion Lady Monarchs and three WNBA teams, most notably the Sacramento Monarchs
 João Santos – Nevada Wolf Pack

Romania

Active in the US
 Sabrina Ionescu (dual US/Romanian citizen by birth) – Oregon Ducks, New York Liberty; has represented the U.S. at youth and senior levels.

Active outside the US
 Gabriela Mărginean – Drexel Dragons
 Vlad Moldoveanu – George Mason Patriots, American Eagles
 Alexandru Olah – Northwestern University
 Florina Pașcalău – Seattle Storm

Former players
 Gheorghe Mureșan – Washington Bullets, New Jersey Nets
 Constantin Popa – Miami Hurricanes

Russia

Active in the US
 Timofey Mozgov – New York Knicks, Denver Nuggets, Cleveland Cavaliers, Los Angeles Lakers, Brooklyn Nets, Orlando Magic
 Pavel Zakharov – Gonzaga Bulldogs

Active outside the US
 Sergey Karasev – Cleveland Cavaliers, Canton Charge, Brooklyn Nets
 Victor Khryapa – Portland Trail Blazers, Chicago Bulls
 Yaroslav Korolev – Los Angeles Clippers and two D-League teams
 Fedor Likholitov – VCU Rams
 Sergei Monia – Portland Trail Blazers, Sacramento Kings
 Ruslan Pateev – Arizona State Sun Devils
 Pavel Podkolzin – Dallas Mavericks, Fort Worth Flyers
 Samson Ruzhentsev – Florida Gators
 Alexey Shved – Three NBA teams

Former players
 Svetlana Abrosimova – Connecticut Huskies and three WNBA teams
 Yelena Baranova – Three WNBA teams
 Sergei Bazarevich – Atlanta Hawks
 Dmitri Domani – Saint Joseph's Hawks
 Vadim Fedotov – Buffalo Bulls
 Becky Hammon (dual US/Russian citizen) – San Antonio Silver Stars/Stars
 Hammon played U.S. college basketball at Colorado State, and also in the WNBA for the New York Liberty, before becoming a Russian citizen in 2008.
 Sasha Kaun – Kansas Jayhawks, Cleveland Cavaliers
 Andrei Kirilenko (also naturalized in the U.S.) – Four NBA teams, most notably with the Utah Jazz
 Evgeni Kisurin – VCU Rams
 Fedor Likholitov – VCU Rams
 Svetlana Pankratova – VCU Rams
 Kirill Pishchalnikov – VCU Rams
 Maria Stepanova – Phoenix Mercury
 Alexei Vasiliev - Buffalo Bulls

Serbia

Active in the US
 Lazar Grbović – Arkansas State Red Wolves
 Nikola Jokić – Denver Nuggets
 Boban Marjanović – San Antonio Spurs, Detroit Pistons, Los Angeles Clippers, Philadelphia 76ers, Dallas Mavericks
 Bogdan Bogdanović – Sacramento Kings, Atlanta Hawks
 Nedeljko Prijovic – Texas State Bobcats, Maine Black Bears
 Vuk Vulikić – UTEP Miners
 Aleksej Pokuševski – Oklahoma City Thunder

Active outside the US
 Nemanja Bjelica – Minnesota Timberwolves, Sacramento Kings, Golden State Warriors
 Nemanja Calasan (also a naturalized citizen of Switzerland) – Purdue Boilermakers
 Ana Dabović – Los Angeles Sparks
 Nikola Dragović – UCLA Bruins
 Marko Gudurić  – Memphis Grizzlies, Fenerbahçe
 Mile Ilić – New Jersey Nets
 Stefan Kenić – Cleveland State Vikings, Chattanooga Mocs
 Balša Koprivica – Florida State Seminoles
 Dejan Kravić – Texas Tech Red Raiders
 Ognjen Kuzmić – Golden State Warriors
 Jelena Milovanović – Washington Mystics
 Nemanja Nedović – Golden State Warriors
 Filip Petrušev – Gonzaga Bulldogs
 Vasilije Pušica – San Diego Toreros, Northeastern Huskies
 Miroslav Raduljica – Milwaukee Bucks, Minnesota Timberwolves
 Dušan Ristić – Arizona Wildcats
 Alen Smailagić – Golden State Warriors
 Miloš Teodosić – Los Angeles Clippers

Former players
 Miloš Babić – Tennessee Tech Golden Eagles, Cleveland Cavaliers and Miami Heat
 Darko Čohadarević – Texas Tech Red Raiders
 Radisav Ćurčić – Dallas Mavericks
 Nikola Cvetinović – Akron Zips
 Rastko Cvetković – Denver Nuggets
 Predrag Danilović – Miami Heat and Dallas Mavericks
 Vlade Divac – Los Angeles Lakers, Charlotte Hornets, and Sacramento Kings
 Zoran Vasiljev – El Camino JC, Dakota State University
 Aleksandar Đorđević – Portland Trail Blazers
 Luka Drča – Utah Utes
 Rade Džambić – Texas–Pan American Broncs
 Gordana Grubin – Los Angeles Sparks, Indiana Fever, Phoenix Mercury, and Houston Comets
 Marko Jarić – Los Angeles Clippers, Minnesota Timberwolves, and Memphis Grizzlies
 Zoran Jovanović – LSU Tigers
 Nikola Koprivica – Washington State Cougars
 Nenad Krstić – New Jersey Nets, Oklahoma City Thunder, and Boston Celtics
 Darko Miličić – Detroit Pistons, Orlando Magic, Memphis Grizzlies, New York Knicks, Minnesota Timberwolves, and Boston Celtics
 Žarko Paspalj – San Antonio Spurs
 Mirko Pavlović – Southern Illinois Salukis
 Miroslav Pecarski – Marist Red Foxes
 Jasmina Perazić – Maryland Terrapins
 Kosta Perović – Golden State Warriors
 Nemanja Petrović – Saint Joseph's Hawks
 Ivan Radenović – Arizona Wildcats
 Vladimir Radmanović – Seattle SuperSonics, Los Angeles Clippers, Los Angeles Lakers, Charlotte Bobcats, Golden State Warriors, Atlanta Hawks, and Chicago Bulls
 Zoran Radović – Wichita State Shockers
 Nikola Rakićević – Buffalo Bulls
 Igor Rakočević – Minnesota Timberwolves
 Željko Rebrača – Detroit Pistons, Atlanta Hawks, and Los Angeles Clippers
 Boban Savović – Ohio State Buckeyes
 Predrag Savović – UAB Blazers, Hawaii Rainbow Warriors, and Denver Nuggets
 Marko Špica – Central Michigan Chippewas
 Jelena Špirić – Nebraska Cornhuskers
 Peja Stojaković – Sacramento Kings, Indiana Pacers, New Orleans Hornets, Toronto Raptors, and Dallas Mavericks
 Dragan Tarlać – Chicago Bulls

Slovakia

Active in the US
 Michal Čekovský – Maryland Terrapins

Active outside the US
 Vladimír Brodziansky – TCU Horned Frogs
Marek Dolezaj – Syracuse Orange
 Martin Rančík – Iowa State Cyclones

Former players
 Richard Petruška – Houston Rockets

Slovenia

Active in the US
 Luka Dončić – Dallas Mavericks
 Goran Dragić – Three NBA teams, currently with the Brooklyn Nets
 Vlatko Čančar – Denver Nuggets

Active outside the US
 Zoran Dragić – Phoenix Suns, Miami Heat
 Uroš Slokar – Toronto Raptors
 Beno Udrih – Eight NBA teams
 Sasha Vujačić – Four NBA teams

Former players
 Primož Brezec – Six NBA teams
 Erazem Lorbek – Michigan State Spartans
 Marko Milič – Phoenix Suns
 Boštjan Nachbar – Three NBA teams
 Radoslav Nesterović – Four NBA teams

Spain

Active in the US 
 Maite Cazorla – Oregon Ducks, Atlanta Dream
 Willy Hernangómez – New York Knicks, Charlotte Hornets currently with the New Orleans Pelicans
 Juancho Hernangómez – Denver Nuggets, Minnesota Timberwolves, Boston Celtics, Utah Jazz currently with the Toronto Raptors
 Serge Ibaka (born in the Republic of the Congo) – Oklahoma City Thunder, Orlando Magic, Toronto Raptors, Los Angeles Clippers currently with the Milwaukee Bucks
 Sancho Lyttle (dual Vincentian/Spanish citizen) – Houston Comets, Atlanta Dream, currently with the Phoenix Mercury
 Although Lyttle also played U.S. college basketball (at Houston), she was not a Spanish citizen at that time. 
 Astou Ndour (born in Senegal) – San Antonio Stars, Chicago Sky
 Leticia Romero – Kansas State Wildcats, Florida State Seminoles, Dallas Wings
 Ricky Rubio – Minnesota Timberwolves, Utah Jazz, Phoenix Suns, Indiana Pacers currently with the Cleveland Cavaliers
 Santiago Aldama - Memphis Grizzlies
 Usman Garuba - Houston Rockets

Active outside the US
 Marc Gasol – Memphis Grizzlies, Toronto Raptors, Los Angeles Lakers
 Álex Abrines – Oklahoma City Thunder
 Francis Alonso – UNC Greensboro Spartans
 Ivan Aurrecoechea – New Mexico State Aggies
 Víctor Claver – Portland Trail Blazers
 Anna Cruz – New York Liberty, Minnesota Lynx
 Marta Fernández – Los Angeles Sparks
 Rudy Fernández – Portland Trail Blazers, Denver Nuggets
 Nuria Martínez - Minnesota Lynx
 Nikola Mirotić (born in Montenegro) – Chicago Bulls, New Orleans Pelicans, Milwaukee Bucks
 Leonor Rodríguez – Florida State Seminoles
 Sergio Rodríguez – Four NBA teams
 Sebastian Saiz – Ole Miss Rebels
 Marta Xargay - Phoenix Mercury

Former players
 Pau Gasol – Six NBA teams but most notably with the Los Angeles Lakers
 José Calderón – Seven NBA teams
 Rodrigo de la Fuente – Washington State Cougars
 Jorge Garbajosa – Toronto Raptors
 Óscar García – Fairfield Stags
 Iker Iturbe – Clemson Tigers
 Raül López – Utah Jazz
 Antonio Martín – Pepperdine Waves
 Fernando Martín – Portland Trail Blazers
 Javier Mendiburu – Green Bay Phoenix
 Juan Carlos Navarro - Memphis Grizzlies
 Amaya Valdemoro – Houston Comets

Sweden

Active in the US
 Farhiya Abdi (dual Swedish/Somali citizen by birth) – Los Angeles Sparks
 Jonas Jerebko (dual Swedish/US citizen by birth) – Detroit Pistons, Boston Celtics, Utah Jazz, Golden State Warriors
 Amanda Zahui B. (dual Swedish/Ivorian citizen by birth) – Minnesota Golden Gophers, Tulsa Shock/Dallas Wings, New York Liberty

Active outside the US
 Selma Delibašić (born in modern-day Bosnia and Herzegovina) – Duquesne Dukes
 Carl Engström – Alabama Crimson Tide
 Christian Maråker – Pacific Tigers
 Chioma Nnamaka – Georgia Tech Yellow Jackets, Atlanta Dream
 Jeffery Taylor (dual Swedish/US citizen by birth) – Vanderbilt Commodores, Charlotte Bobcats/Hornets

Former players
 Midde Hamrin – Lamar Lady Cardinals
 Tanja Kostic – Oregon State Beavers and three teams in the ABL and WNBA

Switzerland

Active in the US
 Thabo Sefolosha – Oklahoma City Thunder, Atlanta Hawks, Utah Jazz
 Clint Capela – Houston Rockets, Atlanta Hawks

Turkey

Active in the US
 Ersan İlyasova – Six NBA teams, currently with the Milwaukee Bucks
 Enes Kanter Freedom – Utah Jazz, Oklahoma City Thunder, New York Knicks, Boston Celtics, currently with the Portland Trail Blazers. 
 Ömer Yurtseven – North Carolina State Wolfpack, Georgetown Hoyas, currently with the Miami Heat.
 Cedi Osman – Cleveland Cavaliers
 Furkan Korkmaz – Philadelphia 76ers
 Alperen Şengün – Houston Rockets

Active outside the US
Men
 Furkan Aldemir – Philadelphia 76ers
 Engin Atsür – NC State Wolfpack
 Gökbörü Aygar – Northeastern Huskies
 Doğuş Balbay – Texas Longhorns
 Semih Erden – Boston Celtics, Cleveland Cavaliers
 Erten Gazi (dual Cypriot/Turkish citizen by birth) – DePaul Blue Demons, Fordham Rams
 Deniz Kılıçlı – West Virginia Mountaineers

Women
 Nihan Anaz – South Carolina Gamecocks, California Golden Bears
 İpek Derici – North Carolina Tar Heels
 Şebnem Kimyacıoğlu (dual US/Turkish citizen by birth) – Stanford Cardinal
 Tuğba Palazoğlu – Western Illinois Leathernecks
 During Palazoğlu's college career, Western Illinois women's teams were known as Westerwinds.
 Nevriye Yılmaz – Phoenix Mercury, San Antonio Silver Stars

Former players
 Ömer Büyükaycan – Loyola Ramblers
 İbrahim Kutluay – Seattle SuperSonics
 Mehmet Okur – Three NBA teams, most notably the Utah Jazz; currently a player development coach for the Phoenix Suns
 Mirsad Türkcan (born in modern-day Serbia) – New York Knicks, Milwaukee Bucks
 Hedo Türkoğlu – Six NBA teams, most notably the Orlando Magic
 Ömer Aşık – Three NBA teams, most notably the Chicago Bulls, Houston Rockets

Ukraine

Active in the US
 Pavlo Dziuba – Maryland Terrapins
 Nikita Konstantynovskyi – Tulsa Golden Hurricane
 Alex Len – Maryland Terrapins, Phoenix Suns
 Volodymyr Markovetskyy – San Francisco Dons
 George Maslennikov – Canisius Golden Griffins
 Sviatoslav Mykhailiuk – Kansas Jayhawks, Detroit Pistons
 Rostyslav Novitshyi – Fordham Rams
 Max Shulga – Utah State Aggies
 Ilya Tyrtyshnik – Ole Miss Rebels
 Dima Zdor – Grand Canyon Antelopes

Active outside the US
 Bogdan Bliznyuk – Eastern Washington Eagles 
 Joel Bolomboy – Weber State Wildcats, Utah Jazz
 Kyrylo Fesenko – Utah Jazz, Indiana Pacers
 Volodymyr Gerun – West Virginia Mountaineers, Portland Pilots
 Viacheslav Kravtsov – Detroit Pistons, Phoenix Suns
 Kyryl Natyazhko – Arizona Wildcats
 Inga Orekhova – South Florida Bulls, Atlanta Dream
 Oleksiy Pecherov – Washington Wizards, Minnesota Timberwolves

Former players
 Slava Medvedenko – Los Angeles Lakers, Atlanta Hawks
 Vitaly Potapenko – Wright State Raiders and four NBA teams
 Alexander Volkov – Atlanta Hawks

United Kingdom

Active in the US
 Temi Fagbenle (dual US/British citizen) – Harvard Crimson, USC Trojans, Minnesota Lynx
 Ben Gordon (dual British/US citizen) – UConn Huskies and four NBA teams, currently with the Texas Legends
 Katie Lou Samuelson (dual US/British citizen by birth) – UConn Huskies, Chicago Sky, Dallas Wings; has represented the US at youth level
 OG Anunoby - Indiana Hoosiers, Toronto Raptors

Active outside the US
 Dominique Allen – Oral Roberts Golden Eagles
 Kieron Achara – Duquesne Dukes
 Ogo Adegboye – St. Bonaventure Bonnies
 Devan Bailey – Central Connecticut Blue Devils
 Eric Boateng – Arizona State Sun Devils and two D-League teams
 Matthew Bryan-Amaning – Washington Huskies
 Ben Eaves – Connecticut Huskies, Rhode Island Rams
 Joel Freeland – Portland Trail Blazers
 Chantelle Handy – Marshall Thundering Herd
 Andrew Lawrence – Charleston Cougars
 Mike Lenzly – Wofford Terriers
 Pops Mensah-Bonsu – George Washington Colonials and five NBA teams
 Byron Mullens (dual US/British citizen by birth) – Ohio State Buckeyes and four NBA teams
 Justin Robinson – Rider Broncs
 Karlie Samuelson (dual US/British citizen by birth) – Stanford Cardinal, Los Angeles Sparks, Dallas Wings; has represented the UK at youth and senior levels.
 Andrew Sullivan – Villanova Wildcats
 Raphell Thomas-Edwards – Buffalo Bulls
 Shona Thorburn (dual British/Canadian citizen) – Utah Utes, Seattle Storm

Former players
 John Amaechi (dual US/British citizen by birth) – Vanderbilt Commodores, Penn State Nittany Lions, and three NBA teams
 Robert Archibald – Illinois Fighting Illini and four NBA teams
 Luol Deng (born in what is now South Sudan, naturalized in the UK) – Duke Blue Devils and five NBA teams, most notably the Chicago Bulls
 James Donaldson (dual British/US citizen) – Washington State Cougars and five NBA teams
 Neil Fingleton – North Carolina Tar Heels, Holy Cross Crusaders, Boston Frenzy (21st-century ABA)
 Joel Freeland – Portland Trail Blazers
 Steve Nash (born a British citizen in South Africa, naturalized in Canada) – Santa Clara Broncos and three NBA teams, most notably the Phoenix Suns
 Richard Midgley – California Bears 
 Peter Scantlebury – Winthrop Eagles
 Menelik Watson – Marist Red Foxes Switched sports to football where he transferred to Saddleback College and then to Florida St before being drafted by the Oakland Raiders.  He presently plays OT for the Oakland Raiders

See also

List of foreign NBA players
List of foreign NBA coaches
List of NBA players by country:
List of Australian NBA players
List of Canadian NBA players
List of Croatian NBA players
List of French NBA players
List of Greek NBA players
List of Italian NBA players
List of Lithuanian NBA players
List of Montenegrin NBA players
List of Serbian NBA players
List of Turkish NBA players
Race and ethnicity in the NBA
List of foreign WNBA players

References

Euro
Expatriate basketball people in the United States